The World Group II was the second highest level of Fed Cup competition in 2018. The winning nations advanced to the World Group Play-offs, and the losing nations were relegated to the World Group II Play-offs.

Slovakia vs. Russia

Australia vs. Ukraine

Romania vs. Canada

Italy vs. Spain

References 

World Group II